Zdzisław Styczeń (16 October 1894, in Przemyśl – 20 December 1978, in Kraków) was a footballer from Poland (midfielder) who played for such clubs as Cracovia and Wisła Kraków. He played in the first game of the Poland national football team. Styczeń was also a part of the Poland national football team that participated in the 1924 Summer Olympics.

References

External links
 Player profile on pkol.pl 

1894 births
1978 deaths
Polish footballers
Poland international footballers
MKS Cracovia (football) players
Wisła Kraków players
Olympic footballers of Poland
Footballers at the 1924 Summer Olympics
People from Przemyśl
Sportspeople from Podkarpackie Voivodeship
Polish Austro-Hungarians
People from the Kingdom of Galicia and Lodomeria
Association football midfielders